ESPN NBA HangTime '95 is a basketball video game developed and published by Sony Imagesoft for the Sega CD.

Gameplay
ESPN NBA HangTime '95 includes all 27 NBA teams which are represented by their top three players at the time as well as 12 International country teams represented by fictional athletes. Players choose a team and play 2-on-2 basketball matches in exhibition or season modes. Hangtime'''s gameplay has been compared to NBA Jam's, and features arcade-style moves like super spins and dunks. Hangtime also features full-motion video segments of ESPN's Dan Patrick and Stuart Scott covering the matches.

Reception

The game was received poorly and multiple reviews compared it negatively to NBA Jam. Next Generation reviewed the game, rating it one star out of five, and was very critical of the game, even advising not to "put other games near this one, it could be contagious."

Reviews
Video Games & Computer Entertainment - Mar, 1995

See alsoNBA ShootOut'', Sony's successor for the PlayStation

References

External links

1994 video games
Basketball video games
Epic/Sony Records games
ESPN video games
Multiplayer and single-player video games
National Basketball Association video games
Sega CD games
Sega CD-only games
Video games developed in the United States